Nathaniel David Mermin (born 30 March 1935) is a solid-state physicist at Cornell University best known for the eponymous Mermin–Wagner theorem, his application of the term "boojum" to superfluidity, his textbook with Neil Ashcroft on solid-state physics, and for contributions to the foundations of quantum mechanics and quantum information science.

Education and career
Mermin was born in 1935 in New Haven, Connecticut. He obtained a bachelor's degree in mathematics from Harvard University in 1956, graduating summa cum laude. He remained at Harvard for his graduate studies, earning a PhD in physics in 1961. After holding postdoctoral positions at the University of Birmingham and the University of California, San Diego, he joined the Cornell University faculty in 1964.   He became a Cornell professor emeritus in 2006.

Early in his career, Mermin worked in statistical physics and condensed-matter physics, including the study of matter at low temperatures, the behavior of electron gases, the classification of quasicrystals, and quantum chemistry. His later research contributions included work in quantum information science and the foundations of quantum mechanics.

Mermin was the first to note how the three-particle GHZ state demonstrates that no local hidden-variable theory can explain quantum correlations, and together with Asher Peres, he introduced the "magic square" proof, another demonstration that attempting to "complete" quantum mechanics with hidden variables does not work. In collaboration with Charles Bennett and Gilles Brassard, he made a significant early contribution to quantum cryptography. Starting in 2012, he has advocated the interpretation known as Quantum Bayesianism, or QBism.

In 2003, the journal Foundations of Physics published a bibliography of Mermin's writing that included three books, 125 technical articles, 18 pedagogical articles, 21 general articles, 34 book reviews, and 24 "Reference Frame" articles from Physics Today.

Mermin was elected a Fellow of the American Physical Society in 1969, and he was elected a member of the National Academy of Sciences in 1991.

Word and phrase coinages
Inspired by Lewis Carroll's comic poem The Hunting of the Snark, Mermin introduced the term boojum into the vocabulary of condensed-matter physics.

In his book It's About Time (2005), one of several expository pieces on special relativity, he suggests that the English foot (0.3048 meters) be slightly modified to approximately 29.98 cm. This adaptation of a physical unit is one of several ploys that Mermin uses to draw students into spacetime geometry. In the book, Mermin writes:

Henceforth, by 1 foot we shall mean the distance light travels in a nanosecond. A foot, if you will, is a light nanosecond (and a nanosecond, even more nicely, can be viewed as a light foot). ... If it offends you to redefine the foot ... then you may define 0.299792458 meters to be 1 phoot, and think "phoot" (conveniently evocative of the Greek φωτος, "light") whenever you read "foot".

Though it is often misattributed to Richard Feynman, Mermin coined the phrase "shut up and calculate!" to characterize the views of many physicists regarding the interpretation of quantum mechanics.

Books
 1968: Space and Time in Special Relativity, McGraw Hill 
 1976: (with Neil Ashcroft) Solid State Physics, Holt, Rinehart and Winston 
 1990: Boojums All the Way Through, Cambridge University Press 
 2005: It's About Time: Understanding Einstein's Relativity, Princeton University Press 
 2007: Quantum Computer Science, Cambridge University Press 
 2016: Why Quark Rhymes with Pork: and Other Scientific Diversions, Cambridge University Press

References

Further reading

External links

 Mermin's homepage
 
 

Living people
1935 births
Harvard University alumni
Cornell University faculty
Cornell Laboratory of Atomic and Solid State Physics
21st-century American physicists
Members of the United States National Academy of Sciences
Fellows of the American Physical Society